Attert is a municipality of Wallonia located in the province of Luxembourg, Belgium. 

On 1 January 2007 the municipality, which covers 70.94 km², had 4,802 inhabitants, giving a population density of 67.7 inhabitants per km².

The municipality consists of the following districts: Attert, Nobressart, Nothomb, Thiaumont, and Tontelange. 

Other population centers include:

The municipality falls within the Luxembourgish-speaking Arelerland and several street name signs are bilingual.

Sister cities 

Attert is twinned with:

  Taktaharkány (Hungary) since 2003
  Kruishoutem (Belgium) since 2004
  Bakałarzewo (Poland) since 2005
  Bandundu, Democratic Republic of the Congo)

See also 
 List of protected heritage sites in Attert

References

External links
 

 
Municipalities of Luxembourg (Belgium)